Catgut Ya' Tongue? is an album by FourPlay String Quartet. This is their first studio album; it mainly consists of covers with two original tracks.

Track listing

1998 albums
FourPlay String Quartet albums